Angélique Ngoma is a Gabonese politician who served as Minister of Defence from October 2009 to January 2011.

Career
Ngoma was a national delegate of the Women's Union of the Gabonese Democratic Party. She served as Minister for Family, Child Welfare and Advancement of Women from 1999 until 2009. In October 2009, she was appointed Minister of Defence by President Ali Bongo Ondimba, one of the few ministers to be reappointed. In 2011, she was appointed Minister of Labor, Employment and Social Welfare.

In June 2015, Ngoma was elected to the National Assembly for the second seat of Lower Banio. As of 2017, she is President of the Committee on Environment and Sustainable Development.

References

Living people
Members of the National Assembly of Gabon
Gabonese women in politics
Gabonese Democratic Party politicians
Defence ministers of Gabon
Female defence ministers
Year of birth missing (living people)
Women government ministers of Gabon
21st-century Gabonese people